Animalia is a 2023 science fiction film directed by Sofia Alaoui in her feature directorial debut, from a screenplay she wrote.

The film had its world premiere at the 2023 Sundance Film Festival.

Cast
Oumaïma Barid as Itto
Mehdi Dehbi as Amine
Fouad Oughaou
Souad Khouyi
Hiam Abbass

Production
The principal photography concluded in November 2021 after thirty five days of filming.

Release
Animalia had its world premiere at the 2023 Sundance Film Festival, on 20 January 2023.

Reception
On the review aggregator website Rotten Tomatoes, 100% of 8 critics' reviews are positive, with an average rating of 7.90/10.

References

2023 directorial debut films
2023 science fiction films
2020s French-language films
2020s Arabic-language films
Berber-language films
Films set in Morocco
French pregnancy films
2020s pregnancy films
Alien visitations in films